Thomas Hungerford may refer to:
Sir Thomas Hungerford (Speaker) (died 1398), first person recorded as holding the (pre-existing) office of Speaker of the House of Commons
Sir Thomas Hungerford of Rowden (died 1469), eldest son of Robert Hungerford, 3rd Baron Hungerford
Thomas Hungerford (died 1582), MP for Heytesbury (UK Parliament constituency)
Thomas Hungerford (died 1595), MP for Great Bedwyn (UK Parliament constituency)
Thomas Hungerford (Australian politician) (1823–1904), Australian pastoralist and politician
Thomas W. Hungerford (1939–2014), American mathematician

See also
Tom Hungerford (1915–2014), popularly known as T. A. G. Hungerford, Australian writer